Žydrūnas Karčemarskas (born 24 May 1983) is a Lithuanian former professional footballer who played as a goalkeeper. Between 2003 and 2013, he earned 66 caps with Lithuania national team.

Club career
Karčemarskas was born in Alytus. He started his career in his home town at Dainava Alytus before moving to Žalgiris Vilnius in 2001. After one year in Vilnius, he joined Dynamo Moscow, where he played until 2009. In January 2010, he joined Süper Lig side Gaziantepspor. He was named Lithuanian Footballer of the Year in 2011 and 2012 by the Lithuanian Football Federation.

In July 2016, Karčemarskas joined Osmanlıspor on a three-year contract. At the end of the 2017–18 season, his team was relegated to the TFF 1. Lig after finishing in 16th place. Karčemarskas played one more season for Osmanlıspor in the second division before retiring from professional football in summer 2019.

International career
Karčemarskas became the first-choice goalkeeper for Lithuania national team in 2004, and until 2013, he earned 82 caps for his country.

Karčemarskas has also represented Lithuania at under-21 level.

Off the pitch

Poker
After finishing professional's career, Karčemarskas began to play in the live poker tournaments. On 23 October 2022, he won the main event of the Vilnius Open Championship, the largest tournament in Lithuania.

References

External links

1983 births
Living people
Sportspeople from Alytus
Association football goalkeepers
Lithuanian footballers
Lithuania international footballers
A Lyga players
Russian Premier League players
Süper Lig players
FC Dynamo Moscow players
FK Dainava Alytus players
FK Žalgiris players
Gaziantepspor footballers
Ankaraspor footballers
Lithuanian expatriate footballers
Lithuanian expatriate sportspeople in Russia
Expatriate footballers in Russia
Lithuanian expatriate sportspeople in Turkey
Expatriate footballers in Turkey
Lithuanian poker players